Havana Moon is a 1983 album by Carlos Santana released as a solo project.

It features covers of Bo Diddley and Chuck Berry songs and performances by Booker T & the MGs, Willie Nelson and the Fabulous Thunderbirds, and also Carlos' father José singing "Vereda Tropical", a song Carlos had first heard when his father was serenading his mother following an argument.

Reception

J. D. Considine of Rolling Stone deemed Carlos Santana recording Tex-Mex music to be a natural fit, and felt that the Fabulous Thunderbirds were ideal collaborators for such a project. He particularly praised the renditions of "Who Do you Love" and "Havana Moon" for throwing in inspired Tex-Mex elements while staying true to the appeal of the original recordings. However, he found the album's roaming to other styles on the six cuts recorded without the Fabulous Thunderbirds to be dissatisfying, remarking, "It's not so much that Havana Moon is inconsistent — although it's that, too — as it is confusing, jumping from style to style as if Carlos Santana weren't sure what he wanted to do. It's nice to see that he's eager to expand his horizons, but it's disappointing that he undercuts his efforts by attempting to cover all the bases."

Track listing

Side one
 "Watch Your Step" (Phil Belmonte, Bobby Parker) – 4:01
 "Lightnin'" (Booker T. Jones, Carlos Santana) – 3:51
 "Who Do You Love?" (Ellas McDaniel) – 2:55
 "Mudbone" (Santana) – 5:51
 "One with You" (Jones) – 5:14

Side two
 "Ecuador" (Santana) – 1:10
 "Tales of Kilimanjaro" (Alan Pasqua, Armando Peraza, Raul Rekow, Santana) – 4:50
 "Havana Moon" (Chuck Berry) – 4:09
 "Daughter of the Night" (Hasse Huss, Mikael Rickfors) – 4:18
 "They All Went to Mexico" (Greg Brown) – 4:47
 "Vereda Tropical" (Gonzalo Curiel) – 4:57

Personnel
 Roberto Moreno – vocals
 Willie Nelson – vocals
 Greg Walker – vocals
 Candelario Lopez – vocals
 Carlos Santana – guitar, percussion, backing vocals
 José Santana – violin, vocals
 Chris Solberg – keyboards, guitar, vocals
 Jimmie Vaughan – guitar
 Booker T. Jones – keyboards, backing vocals
 Richard Baker – keyboards
 Barry Beckett – keyboards
 Alan Pasqua – keyboards, vocals
 Flaco Jiménez – accordion
 Orestes Vilató – flute, percussion, timbales, backing vocals
 Kim Wilson – harmonica, backing vocals
 Greg Adams – strings, horn
 Jose Salcedo – trombone, trumpet
 Óscar Chávez – trombone, trumpet
 Mic Gillette – trumpet, horn
 Lanette Stevens – horn
 Emilio Castillo – horn, backing vocals
 Marc Russo – horn
 Tramaine Hawkins – horn
 Stephen Kupka – horn
 Gabriel Arias – violin
 Francisco Coronado – violin
 Raymundo Coronado – violin
 Keith Ferguson – bass
 Luis Gonsalez – bass
 David Hood – bass
 David Margen – bass, percussion
 Fran Christina – drums
 Armando Peraza – percussion, bongos, vocals
 Graham Lear – percussion, drums
 Raul Rékow – percussion, conga, backing vocals
 Alex Ligertwood – percussion, vocals
 Cherline Hall – backing vocals

Charts

References

External links
 
 Havana Moon review at UltimateSantana.com 
  Havana Moon review & credits at AllMusic.com

1983 albums
Albums produced by Jerry Wexler
Albums produced by Barry Beckett
Carlos Santana albums
CBS Records albums